Vol. 3... Life and Times of S. Carter is the fourth studio album by American rapper Jay-Z. It was released on December 28, 1999, by Roc-A-Fella Records and Def Jam Recordings. According to USA Today critic Steve Jones, the record marked a return to the street-oriented sound of Jay-Z's 1996 debut album, Reasonable Doubt. Vol. 3... featured production from Swizz Beatz, Timbaland, K-Rob, DJ Clue, Rockwilder, DJ Premier, and Irv Gotti, among others.

The album was well received by critics and debuted at number one on the Billboard 200, selling 462,000 copies in its first week. It has since sold over three million copies and been certified triple platinum by the Recording Industry Association of America.

Release and reception 

Vol. 3... was released on December 28, 1999, and sold 462,000 copies in its first week, while debuting at number one on the Billboard 200. The sales week was thirty-percent more than the first-week sales of Jay-Z's previous album, Vol. 2... Hard Knock Life (1998). On February 14, 2001, it was certified triple platinum by the Recording Industry Association of America (RIAA). In 2009, the album reached sales of 3,093,000 copies, according to Nielsen SoundScan.

In a contemporary review, Rolling Stone critic Kris Ex wrote that Jay-Z "has become a better architect of songs" while hailing Vol. 3... as "his strongest album to date, with music that's filled with catchy hooks, rump-shaking beats and lyrics fueled by Jay's hustler's vigilance". Richard Harrington from The Washington Post found the record to be "full of reputation-building swagger, cataloguing of lyrical skills and autobiographical perspective". Reviewing the album in Entertainment Weekly, Anthony DeCurtis said it reconnects with Jay-Z's urban demographic, "with flair", while Steve Jones of USA Today was particularly impressed by his lyrics and flow, finding both to be "razor-sharp as ever". In The Village Voice, Robert Christgau argued that Jay-Z has too much at stake commercially to depart from "playing the now-a-rapper-now-a-thug 'reality' game with his customers, thugs and fantasists both", but he impresses with "a rugged, expansive vigor, nailing both come-fly-with-me cosmopolitanism and the hunger for excitement that's turned gangster hangouts into musical hotbeds from Buenos Aires to Kansas City".  Fellow Voice critic Miles Marshall Lewis called Jay-Z "the best MC in hip hop" and Vol. 3… "the quintessential 2000-model hip hop album". Soren Baker was less impressed in the Los Angeles Times, writing that the record lacks the "biting humor and spectacular wordplay" of his previous albums.

In The Rolling Stone Album Guide (2004), Jon Caramanica later wrote, "Life & Times of S. Carter took [Vol. 2s] combination of style and substance to its apotheosis. In addition to maintaining a strong lyrical presence, Jay also showcased his talents as a master of flow, changing cadences and rhyme patterns with impressive regularity and flexibility ... Nearly every track on this album was sonically unique, and Jay rode each one with aplomb and skill". AllMusic's John Bush wrote in a retrospective review that a couple of overwrought productions ("Dope Man", "Things That U Do") keep it from being among Jay-Z's best albums.

Track listing 

Notes
  indicates a co-producer
  indicates an additional producer

Personnel 
Credits are adapted from AllMusic.

 Amil – performer
 Darrell Branch – producer
 Mariah Carey – performer
 Drawing Board – art direction
 Fingaz – keyboards
 Kyledidthis – design
 Jay-Z – performer
 Jonathan Mannion – photography
 Memphis Bleek – performer
 Tatsuya Sato – assistant engineer
 Beanie Sigel – performer
 UGK – performer
 Dr. Dre – performer, mixing

Charts

Weekly charts

Year-end charts

Certifications

See also 
List of number-one albums of 2000 (U.S.)
List of number-one R&B albums of 2000 (U.S.)

References

External links 
 

1999 albums
Jay-Z albums
Albums produced by DJ Clue?
Albums produced by DJ Premier
Albums produced by Irv Gotti
Albums produced by Rockwilder
Albums produced by Swizz Beatz
Albums produced by Timbaland
Def Jam Recordings albums
Roc-A-Fella Records albums
Sequel albums